The following is a list of existing and defunct organizations concerned with the advancement of lesbian, gay, bisexual or transgender servicemembers and veterans of national armed forces.

Australia
Defence Force Lesbian Gay Bisexual Transgender and Intersex Information Service (DEFGLIS)

Canada
 LGBT Purge Fund
 Rainbow Veterans Canada

Netherlands
 Pink Army
 Stichting Homosexualiteit en Krijgsmacht (Foundation Homosexuality and Armed Forces)

United States
 American Military Partner Association (formerly known as Campaign for Military Partners)(defunct)
 American Veterans for Equal Rights (formerly known as Gay, Lesbian & Bisexual Veterans of America)
 Blue Alliance
 Knights Out
 Modern Military Association of America (The American Military Partner Association and OutServe-SLDN merged in 2019 to form this new organization)
 OutServe-SLDN
 USNA Out
 Veterans Benevolent Association (defunct)
 Transgender American Veterans Association

See also
 The Queer Insurrection and Liberation Army
 Sacred Band of Thebes

References

 
Lists of LGBT-related organizations